The Doha Marathon (also known as the Ooredoo Doha Marathon for sponsorship reasons) is an annual road-based marathon hosted by Doha, Qatar, since 2013.  The marathon is a World Athletics Elite Label Road Race.  During the race weekend, a half marathon, a 10K race, and a 5K race are also offered.

History 

More than 300 runners participated in the half marathon, which started at the Museum of Islamic Art and ran along the Corniche and back. The half marathon was won by Ethiopian runner Gadissa Chaniada and British runner Rebecca Botwright.

The 2023 edition of the marathon is the first edition of the race listed as an Elite Label Road Race by World Athletics.

See also 
 2006 Asian Games
 2019 World Athletics Championships

Notes

References

External links 
 Official website

2013 establishments in Qatar
International athletics competitions hosted by Qatar
January sporting events
Marathons in Qatar
Recurring sporting events established in 2013
Sports competitions in Doha